Fenoarivo is a town and commune in Madagascar. It belongs to the district of Ambalavao, which is a part of Haute Matsiatra Region. The population of the commune was estimated to be approximately 8,000 in 2001 commune census.

Only primary schooling is available. The majority 98% of the population of the commune are farmers.  The most important crop is rice, while other important products are maize and cassava. Services provide employment for 2% of the population.

See also
Fenoarivo mine

References and notes 

Populated places in Haute Matsiatra